Sir Thomas Buckler Lethbridge, 2nd Baronet (1778–1849) of Sandhill Park in the parish of Bishops Lydeard and of Royal Crescent, in Bath,
 both in Somerset, was an English politician and soldier.

Origins 

He was born in 1778, the son and heir of Sir John Lethbridge, 1st Baronet (d.1815) of Sandhill Park, whose title had been created in 1804 for his help in paying the Prince Regent's gambling debts. He was disinherited by his father, but they were later reconciled, but the will was destroyed shortly before his father died in 1815. His mother Dorothy died in 1831. Through his father's affair with Mary Jane Clairmont, he had an unacknowledged half-sister, Claire Clairmont, mother of Lord Byron's daughter Allegra.

Career
Lethbridge was educated at Oxford. In May 1806 Lethbridge became one of two MPs for Somerset. As a rural squire, he was a staunch defender of the Corn Laws in their last years before repeal and was opposed to the Anti-Corn Law League. Considered a High Tory, he resigned his seat in 1830, two years before the Great Reform Act.

Banking, finance and commerce
Lethbridge was the principal founder of the West Somerset Savings Bank at Taunton, on 6 September 1817. By 1821 the bank had deposits of almost £90,000, with over 2,500 depositors. Despite being regarded as a reliable banker, Lethbridge lost heavily on his own investments. These included speculative canals which remained unbuilt, long tramroads beyond the practical bounds of local technology and ventures in the iron industry. By 1840 he was practically bankrupt.

Iron industry 
Lethbridge's involvement with the South Wales iron industry, across the Bristol Channel from Somerset, began in 1825 when he invested in the Hunt brothers' Pentwyn ironworks, in Abersychan, near Pontypool. In 1836 he was a principal shareholder for the newly formed Monmouthshire Iron and Coal Company on the greenfield 'Victoria' site south of Ebbw Vale. Despite the name, this company was based in Bath and drew most of its subscribers from Somerset, Dorset and Wiltshire. The ironworks progressed well at first and in 1838 produced 692 tons of bar iron. The year 1839 brought a collapse in the price of iron which caused widespread bankruptcies. In November this was compounded by the Newport Rising, encouraged by the ironmasters and coal owner's cutting of wages to save money. By 1840 Lethbridge was effectively bankrupt and sought other means to make money, looking to his estates in Somerset.

Iron ore mining 
Iron ore mining on the Lethbridge estate was long established, albeit on a tiny scale. A number of shallow scrapes in the ground had existed since time immemorial; these were known as the 'Roman' workings, although they were more likely medieval. Lethbridge played a major role in the Brendon Hills Iron Ore Company and the West Somerset Mineral Railway.

Military
Lethbridge was appointed Colonel of the 2nd Somerset Militia on 23 February 1819 and was also colonel-commandant of the West Somerset Yeomanry.

Marriages and children
Lethbridge married twice: 
Firstly, in 1796, to Jacintha Catherine Hesketh (d.1801), a member of the Hesketh family of Rufford Hall in Lancashire, by whom he had two children, a son and a daughter:
John Hesketh Lethbridge, 3rd Baronet, eldest son and heir, who in 1817 married Harriet Rebecca Mytton, a daughter of John Mytton. 
Jacinta ("Jessy") Dorothea Lethbridge, who in 1818 married Ambrose Goddard (1779–1854), MP, of Swindon in Wiltshire, and was the mother of Ambrose Lethbridge Goddard, and of Emma Caroline Goddard who married Greville Phillimore.
Secondly, in 1803, he married Anne Goddard, a daughter Ambrose Goddard, of Swindon in Wiltshire, by whom he had two sons and four daughters:
Ambrose Goddard Lethbridge (died 1875), a barrister and Fellow of All Souls College, Oxford.
Thomas Prowse Lethbridge, who in 1834 married Isabella Escott, a daughter of Rev. Thomas Sweet Escott of Hartrow.
Anna Maria Lethbridge
Lucy Sarah Lethbridge, who in 1831 married Hugh Fitzroy, son of the Rev. Lord Henry Fitzroy.
Emma Dorothea Lethbridge, who in 1826 married Sir Francis Dugdale Astley, 2nd Baronet, the son of Sir John Astley, 1st Baronet, a Member of Parliament.
Frances Margaret Lethbridge.

Death and succession 
He died in 1849. An obituary notes the death of Sir Thomas Buckler Lethbridge, describing him as for many years a prominent Member of the House of Commons on the Conservative side. He was succeeded by his eldest son Sir John Hesketh Lethbridge, 3rd Baronet.

Notes

References

External links 
 

1778 births
1849 deaths
Thomas, 2nd baronet
Baronets in the Baronetage of the United Kingdom
Somerset Militia officers
West Somerset Yeomanry officers